Salin is a town of Minbu District in Magway Region, Myanmar. The town, founded in 1119, is known for its collection of Buddhist monasteries and pagodas, a legacy of its prominent residents, who donated these public buildings. At the 2014 census, the urban population of Salin was 12,500.

Sites of interest
Wetthe Lake - a -wide lake filled with lotus paddies, now a designated bird sanctuary.
The structure was renovated by the government in 2003.
U Ottama Monastery aka Kosaung Monastery (built 1819) - a Buddhist monastery consisting of 9 apartments and a tunnel. During the colonial era, it was known as the U Ottama Fort because revolutionary soldiers took refuge there. The structure was renovated in 2004.

Notes

References

Populated places in Magway Region
Township capitals of Myanmar